Chocho may refer to:

People
 Chocho people, an indigenous people of Mexico
 Chocho language, their language
 Chōcho, a Japanese singer
Andrés Chocho, an Ecuadorian race walker
 Cho Cho, First Lady of Myanmar

Plants
 Andean lupin (Lupinus mutabilis, an edible bean)
 Chayote (Sechium edule, an edible squash)
 Chocho, a synonym of the genus Sechium
 Horse-eye beans (Ormosia, not edible)

Other
 Chocho zubon (Japanese tobi trousers)